Poecilobactris militaris is a species of beetle in the family Cerambycidae, and the only species in the genus Poecilobactris. It was described by Fairmaire in 1887.

References

Saperdini
Beetles described in 1887